Syracuse is a city in Morgan County, Missouri, United States. The population was 172 at the 2010 census. In the middle of the 19th century, the city was the western terminus of the Pacific Railway that reached 108 miles from St. Louis. The current mayor of Syracuse is Duane A. Doyle.

History
Syracuse was originally called Pacific City, and under the latter name was laid out in 1858. The present name is after Syracuse, New York.

Geography
Syracuse is located at  (38.669904, -92.874911).

Demographics

2010 census
As of the census of 2010, there were 172 people, 68 households, and 45 families living in the city. The racial makeup of the city was 98.8% White and 1.2% from two or more races. Hispanic or Latino of any race were 3.5% of the population.

There were 68 households, of which 29.4% had children under the age of 18 living with them, 45.6% were married couples living together, 8.8% had a female householder with no husband present, 11.8% had a male householder with no wife present, and 33.8% were non-families. 22.1% of all households were made up of individuals, and 14.7% had someone living alone who was 65 years of age or older. The average household size was 2.53 and the average family size was 3.04.

The median age in the city was 37.7 years. 25% of residents were under the age of 18; 11.6% were between the ages of 18 and 24; 24.3% were from 25 to 44; 23.3% were from 45 to 64; and 15.7% were 65 years of age or older. The gender makeup of the city was 48.3% male and 51.7% female.

2000 census
As of the census of 2000, there were 172 people, 70 households, and 51 families living in the city. The population density was 451.9 people per square mile (174.8/km). There were 82 housing units at an average density of 215.4 per square mile (83.3/km). The racial makeup of the city was 97.67% White, 0.58% Asian, and 1.74% from two or more races. Hispanic or Latino of any race were 2.33% of the population.

There were 70 households, out of which 31.4% had children under the age of 18 living with them, 62.9% were married couples living together, 7.1% had a female householder with no husband present, and 27.1% were non-families. 20.0% of all households were made up of individuals, and 2.9% had someone living alone who was 65 years of age or older. The average household size was 2.46 and the average family size was 2.78.

In the city, the population was spread out, with 22.7% under the age of 18, 9.3% from 18 to 24, 30.2% from 25 to 44, 32.6% from 45 to 64, and 5.2% who were 65 years of age or older. The median age was 37 years. For every 100 females, there were 107.2 males. For every 100 females age 18 and over, there were 107.8 males.

The median income for a household in the city was $34,773, and the median income for a family was $38,214. Males had a median income of $24,750 versus $21,389 for females. The per capita income for the city was $18,463. None of the families and 4.5% of the population were living below the poverty line, including no under eighteens and 18.2% of those over 64.

KMOS-TV
Syracuse is home to the KMOS TV Tower, built in 2003, operated by the University of Central Missouri. At a height of 2000 ft, it is the tallest structure in Missouri. See University of Central Missouri for details.

Notable people
Bruce Barbour, Locally famous musician and nicknamed "The King of Syracuse"

References

Cities in Morgan County, Missouri
Cities in Missouri
Populated places established in 1858
1858 establishments in Missouri